Kaleköy is a village in the Gökçeada District of Çanakkale Province in Turkey. Its population is 128 (2021). Kurds are majority there.

References

Villages in Gökçeada District